Hope You Like It is the debut studio album by the British glam rock band Geordie.

Track listing
All songs written by Vic Malcolm, except where noted.

Personnel
Brian Johnson - vocals
Vic Malcolm - guitar and vocals
Tom Hill - bass 
Brian Gibson - drums

References

1973 debut albums
Geordie (band) albums